Is There Sex After Death? is a 1971 mockumentary and mondo film.

Plot
Driving through New York City in his Sexmobile, Dr. Harrison Rogers of the Bureau of Sexological Investigation searches out luminary figures in the world of sex. According to the movie, the answer to the title question is: "No, only affection".

Cast
 Alan Abel as Dr. Rogers
 Buck Henry as Dr. Louise Manos
 Marshall Efron as Vince Domino
 Holly Woodlawn as herself
 Robert Downey, Sr. as himself
 Jim Moran as  Dr. Elevenike
 James Randi as Seance Medium
 Earle Doud as Merkin
 Larry Wolf as Sexbowl Announcer/Seance Spirit
 Mink Stole as Dominatrix
 James Dixon as Richard Nixon

Controversy
On March 12, 1980, the ON TV pay channel aired the film on WXON (channel 20, now WMYD) in Detroit. It was scheduled to air again ten days later, but it did not. WXON station manager Aben Johnson, who was alerted to the film's content (including sex and nudity) by a station employee during its original airing, decided against showing it again, substituting Saturday Night Fever instead. ON TV's policy at the time forbade showing any films with an X rating, for adults only; Is There Sex After Death? was apparently not given a rating by the Motion Picture Association of America at all until 1975, when it was granted an 'R' certificate, making the movie seemingly within ON's standards. Still, WXON never showed the film again on its ON TV affiliate, which closed in 1983.

See also
 List of American films of 1971

References

External links
 
 
 

1971 films
1970s sex comedy films
Films set in New York City
American mockumentary films
Mondo films
American sex comedy films
1971 comedy films
1970s English-language films
1970s American films